St. Petersburg, Florida, held an election for mayor on August 27 and November 5, 2013. A non-partisan primary election was held on August 27, 2013. No candidate won a majority of the vote, so the top two finishers, incumbent Mayor Bill Foster and former State Representative Rick Kriseman, advanced to a runoff.

After a campaign described as "nasty", "partisan", "contentious" and "the costliest in [St. Petersburg] history", Foster lost to Kriseman by 56% to 44%, becoming the first incumbent mayor of St. Petersburg to lose a race for re-election in more than 26 years.

Adam C. Smith of the Tampa Bay Times wrote that although 70% of voters approved of where the city was heading and Foster was "a good man who presided over no corruption scandal, no violent racial unrest", he only proved to be "adequate" at the job. He also "underestimat[ed] voters' intelligence, talking about a secret plan to keep the Tampa Bay Rays in St. Petersburg", had an "ever-shifting" position on the St. Petersburg Pier and alienated African-American voters in Midtown. Kriseman, Smith wrote, capitalized on this to win "considerable" African-American support and ran as a "safe, credible alternative for those unimpressed with the incumbent", promising to govern like popular former Mayor Rick Baker.

Primary election

Candidates
 Anthony Cates III
 Paul Congemi, candidate for mayor in 2009
 Kathleen Ford, former city council member (Democrat)
 Bill Foster, incumbent mayor (Republican)
 Rick Kriseman, former state representative (Democrat)

Polling

Results

Endorsements

Runoff election

Polling

Results

References

2013
Mayoral election, 2013
2013 Florida elections
St. Petersburg